The 63rd Annual Primetime Creative Arts Emmy Awards ceremony was held on September 10, 2011 at the Nokia Theatre in Downtown Los Angeles. This is in conjunction with the annual Primetime Emmy Awards and is presented in recognition of technical and other similar achievements in American television programming.

Winners and nominees
Winners are listed first and highlighted in bold:

Governor's Award
 John Walsh

Programs
{| class="wikitable"
|+ 
|-
| style="vertical-align:top;" width="50%" | 
 Deadliest Catch (Discovery Channel) Antiques Roadshow (PBS)
 Hoarders (A&E)
 Kathy Griffin: My Life on the D-List (Bravo)
 MythBusters (Discovery Channel)
 Undercover Boss (CBS)
| style="vertical-align:top;" width="50%" | 
 The Kennedy Center Honors (CBS) Bette Midler: The Showgirl Must Go On (HBO)
 Carrie Fisher in Wishful Drinking (HBO)
 Lady Gaga Presents the Monster Ball Tour: At Madison Square Garden (HBO)
 The Pee-Wee Herman Show on Broadway (HBO)
|-
| style="vertical-align:top;" width="50%" | 
 American Masters (PBS) 30 for 30 (ESPN)
 Anthony Bourdain: No Reservations (Travel Channel)
 Biography (Bio)
 Moguls and Movie Stars (TCM)
 Pioneers of Television (PBS)
| style="vertical-align:top;" width="50%" | 
 Gettysburg (History) Becoming Chaz (OWN)
 His Way (HBO)
 Jaws: The Inside Story (Bio)
 Stand Up to Cancer (ABC / CBS / NBC)
|-
| style="vertical-align:top;" width="50%" | 
 Futurama: "The Late Philip J. Fry" (Comedy Central) The Cleveland Show: "Murray Christmas" (Fox)
 Robot Chicken: "Star Wars Episode III" (Adult Swim)
 The Simpsons: "Angry Dad: The Movie" (Fox)
 South Park: "Crack Baby Athletic Association" (Comedy Central)
| style="vertical-align:top;" width="50%" | 
 Prep & Landing: Operation: Secret Santa (ABC) Adventure Time: "It Came from the Nightosphere" (Cartoon Network)
 Regular Show: "Mordecai and the Rigbys" (Cartoon Network)
 Robot Chicken: "Robot Chicken's DP Christmas Special" (Adult Swim)
 SpongeBob SquarePants: "That Sinking Feeling" (Nickelodeon)
|-
| style="vertical-align:top;" width="50%" | 
 A Child's Garden of Poetry (HBO) Degrassi (TeenNick)
 iCarly (Nickelodeon)
 Victorious (Nickelodeon)
 Wizards of Waverly Place (Disney Channel)
| style="vertical-align:top;" width="50%" | 
 Nick News with Linda Ellerbee: Under the Influence: Kids of Alcoholics (Nickelodeon) Masterclass (HBO)
|-
| style="vertical-align:top;" width="50%" | 
 64th Tony Awards (CBS) 53rd Grammy Awards (CBS)
 68th Golden Globe Awards (NBC)
 83rd Academy Awards (ABC)
| style="vertical-align:top;" width="50%" | 
 The Daily Show Correspondents Explain (thedailyshow.com) 30 Rock: The Webisodes (NBC.com)
|-
| style="vertical-align:top;" width="50%" | 
 Jay Leno's Garage (jaylenosgarage.com) Writer's Draft (Fox Movie Channel)
| style="vertical-align:top;" width="50%" | 
 Freedom Riders (PBS) Gasland (HBO)
 The Most Dangerous Man in America: Daniel Ellsberg and the Pentagon Papers (PBS)
|}

Acting

Art Direction
{| class="wikitable"
|+ 
|-
| style="vertical-align:top;" width="50%" | 
 Hot in Cleveland (Episodes: "Sisterhood of the Traveling SPANX", "I Love Lucci: Part Two", "LeBron Is Le Gone") (TV Land) The Big Bang Theory (Episodes: "The Love Car Displacement", "The 21-Second Excitation", "The Agreement Dissection") (CBS)
 How I Met Your Mother (Episodes: "Subway Wars", "Natural History") (CBS)
 Mike & Molly (Episode: "Pilot") (CBS)
 Rules of Engagement (Episodes: "Last of the Red Hat Lovers", "Singing and Dancing", "The Set Up") (CBS)
| style="vertical-align:top;" width="50%" | 
 Boardwalk Empire (Episode: "Boardwalk Empire") (HBO) The Borgias (Episode: "Lucrezia's Wedding") (Showtime)
 Mad Men (Episode: "Public Relations") (AMC)
 Modern Family (Episode: "Halloween") (ABC)
 True Blood (Episode: "Beautifully Broken") (HBO)
|-
| style="vertical-align:top;" width="50%" | 
 Mildred Pierce (HBO) Downton Abbey (PBS)
 The Kennedys (ReelzChannel)
 Upstairs Downstairs (PBS)
| style="vertical-align:top;" width="50%" | 
 2010 MTV Video Music Awards (MTV) 83rd Academy Awards (ABC)
 American Idol (Episode: "Episode 1018") (Fox)
 Gettysburg (History)
 Saturday Night Live (Episode: "Host: Russell Brand") (NBC)
|}

Casting
{| class="wikitable"
|+ 
|-
| style="vertical-align:top;" width="50%" | 
 Glee (Fox) 30 Rock (NBC)
 The Big C (Showtime)
 Modern Family (ABC)
 Nurse Jackie (Showtime)
| style="vertical-align:top;" width="50%" | 
 Boardwalk Empire (HBO) Game of Thrones (HBO)
 The Good Wife (CBS)
 The Killing (AMC)
 Mad Men (AMC)
|-
| style="vertical-align:top;" width="50%" colspan="2" | 
 Mildred Pierce (HBO) Cinema Verite (HBO)
 Downton Abbey: Season 1 (PBS)
 Too Big to Fail (HBO)
 Upstairs Downstairs (PBS)
|}

Choreography

Cinematography
{| class="wikitable"
|+ 
|-
| style="vertical-align:top;" width="50%" | 
 Two and a Half Men (Episode: "Hookers, Hookers, Hookers") (CBS) How I Met Your Mother (Episode: "Hopeless") (CBS)
 Pair of Kings (Episode: "Return of the Kings") (Disney Channel)
 Retired at 35 (Episode: "Rocket Man") (TV Land)
 Rules of Engagement (Episode: "Uh Oh, It's Magic") (CBS)
 Wizards of Waverly Place (Episode: "Dancing with Angels") (Disney Channel)
| style="vertical-align:top;" width="50%" | 
 Boardwalk Empire (Episode: "Home") (HBO) Boardwalk Empire (Episode: "Boardwalk Empire") (HBO)
 Boardwalk Empire (Episode: "A Return to Normalcy") (HBO)
 The Borgias (Episodes: "The Poisoned Chalice" / "The Assassin") (Showtime)
 The Good Wife (Episode: "Double Jeopardy") (CBS)
|-
| style="vertical-align:top;" width="50%" | 
 Downton Abbey (Episode: "Part One") (PBS) The Kennedys (Episode: "Life Sentences") (ReelzChannel)
 Mildred Pierce (Episode: "Part Five") (HBO)
 The Pillars of the Earth (Episode: "Legacy") (HBO)
 Too Big to Fail (HBO)
| style="vertical-align:top;" width="50%" | 
 Anthony Bourdain: No Reservations (Episode: "Haiti") (Travel Channel) American Masters (Episode: "Troubadours: Carole King / James Taylor and the Rise of the Singer-Songwriter") (PBS)
 Gasland (HBO)
 Gettysburg (History)
 If God Is Willing and da Creek Don't Rise (HBO)
 Whale Wars (Episode: "To the Ends of the Earth") (Animal Planet)
|-
| style="vertical-align:top;" width="50%" colspan="2" | 
 Deadliest Catch (Episode: "Redemption Day") (Discovery Channel) The Amazing Race (Episode: "You Don't Get Paid Unless You Win") (CBS)
 Intervention (Episode: "Rachel") (A&E)
 Survivor (Episode: "Rice Wars") (CBS)
 Top Chef (Episode: "Give Me Your Huddled Masses") (Bravo)
|}

Commercial

Costuming
{| class="wikitable"
|+ 
|-
| style="vertical-align:top;" width="50%" | 
 The Borgias (Episode: "Lucrezia's Wedding") (Showtime) Boardwalk Empire (Episode: "Anastasia") (HBO)
 Game of Thrones (Episode: "The Pointy End") (HBO)
 Glee (Episode: "New York") (Fox)
 Mad Men (Episode: "The Beautiful Girls") (AMC)
| style="vertical-align:top;" width="50%" | 
 Downton Abbey (Episode: "Part One") (PBS) Cinema Verite (HBO)
 Mildred Pierce (Episode: "Part Two") (HBO)
 Upstairs Downstairs (PBS)
|-
| style="vertical-align:top;" width="50%" colspan="2" | 
 Gettysburg (History) (TIE) Portlandia (Episode: "Farm") (IFC) (TIE)|}

Directing

Hairstyling
{| class="wikitable"
|+ 
|-
| style="vertical-align:top;" width="50%" | 
 Mad Men (Episode: "Christmas Comes But Once a Year") (AMC) Boardwalk Empire (Episode: "Boardwalk Empire") (HBO)
 Game of Thrones (Episode: "A Golden Crown") (HBO)
 Glee (Episode: "The Sue Sylvester Shuffle") (Fox)
 Mad Men (Episode: "Hands and Knees") (AMC)
| style="vertical-align:top;" width="50%" | 
 Dancing with the Stars (Episode: "Episode 1106") (ABC) America's Got Talent (Episode: "Episode 529") (NBC)
 iCarly (Episode; "iStart a Fan War") (Nickelodeon)
 The Pee-Wee Herman Show on Broadway (HBO)
 Saturday Night Live (Episode: "Host: Anne Hathaway") (NBC)
|-
| style="vertical-align:top;" width="50%" colspan="2" | 
 The Kennedys (ReelzChannel)'''
 Cinema Verite (HBO)
 Mildred Pierce (Episode: "Part Two") (HBO)
 The Pillars of the Earth (Starz)
|}

Hosting

Interactive Media
{| class="wikitable"
|+ 
|-
| style="vertical-align:top;" | 
 Oscar Digital Experience (ABC) Conan O'Brien Presents: Team Coco (TBS)
 Fringe: Division (Fox)
 Grey's Anatomy Sync (ABC)
 Late Night with Jimmy Fallon (NBC)
|}

Lighting Design / Direction
{| class="wikitable"
|+ 
|-
| style="vertical-align:top;" width="50%" | 
 So You Think You Can Dance (Episode: "Season 7 Finale: Part 2") (Fox) American Idol (Episode: "Finale") (Fox)
 Conan (Episode: "Love Gets Liposuctioned") (TBS)
 Dancing with the Stars (Episode: "Episode 1204A") (ABC)
 Jimmy Kimmel Live! (Episode: "Michel Gondry Directs") (ABC)
| style="vertical-align:top;" width="50%" | 
 53rd Grammy Awards (CBS) 83rd Academy Awards (ABC)
 Lady Gaga Presents the Monster Ball Tour: At Madison Square Garden (HBO)
|}

Main Title Design
{| class="wikitable"
|+ 
|-
| style="vertical-align:top;" | 
 Game of Thrones (HBO) Any Human Heart (PBS)
 Boardwalk Empire (HBO)
 Rubicon (AMC)
 Too Big to Fail (HBO)
|}

Make-up
{| class="wikitable"
|+ 
|-
| style="vertical-align:top;" width="50%" | 
 Boardwalk Empire (Episode: "Boardwalk Empire") (HBO) Game of Thrones (Episode: "Winter Is Coming") (HBO)
 Glee (Episode: "The Rocky Horror Glee Show") (Fox)
 Mad Men (Episode: "The Rejected") (AMC)
 True Blood (Episode: "9 Crimes") (HBO)
| style="vertical-align:top;" width="50%" | 
 Saturday Night Live (Episode: "Host: Jon Hamm") (NBC) Dancing with the Stars (Episode: "Episode 1205") (ABC)
 How I Met Your Mother (Episode: "Bad News") (CBS)
 iCarly (Episode: "iStart a Fan War") (Nickelodeon)
 The Pee-Wee Herman Show on Broadway (HBO)
|-
| style="vertical-align:top;" width="50%" | 
 The Kennedys (ReelzChannel) Cinema Verite (HBO)
 Mildred Pierce (Episode: "Part Two") (HBO)
 The Pillars of the Earth (Starz)
| style="vertical-align:top;" width="50%" | 
 The Walking Dead (Episode: "Days Gone Bye") (AMC) The Cape (Episode: "Razer") (NBC)
 Game of Thrones (Episode: "A Golden Crown") (HBO)
 Glee (Episode: "The Sue Sylvester Shuffle") (Fox)
 Grey's Anatomy (Episode: "Superfreak") (ABC)
|}

Music
{| class="wikitable"
|+ 
|-
| style="vertical-align:top;" width="50%" | 
 American Masters (Episode: "John Muir in the New World") (PBS) 30 Rock (Episode: "100") (NBC)
 Family Guy (Episode: "And Then There Were Fewer") (Fox)
 Family Guy (Episode: "Road to the North Pole") (Fox)
 The Simpsons (Episode: "Treehouse of Horror XXI") (Fox)
| style="vertical-align:top;" width="50%" | 
 Mildred Pierce (Episode: "Part Five") (HBO) Any Human Heart (Episode: "Part Two") (PBS)
 The Pillars of the Earth (Episode: "Anarchy") (Starz)
 Sherlock ("A Study in Pink") (PBS)
 Thurgood (HBO)
|-
| style="vertical-align:top;" width="50%" | 
 Harry Connick Jr.: In Concert on Broadway (PBS) 83rd Academy Awards (ABC)
 2011 Rock and Roll Hall of Fame Induction Ceremony (Fuse)
 An Evening of Stars: Tribute to Chaka Khan (NBC)
 Hitman Returns: David Foster and Friends (PBS)
 The Kennedy Center Honors (CBS)
| style="vertical-align:top;" width="50%" | 
 Saturday Night Live (Episode: "Host: Justin Timberlake", Song: "Justin Timberlake Monologue") (NBC) Family Guy (Episode: "Road to the North Pole", Song: "Christmastime is Killing Us") (Fox)
 Robert Klein: Unfair & Unbalanced (Song: "An American Prayer - Hymn II?") (HBO)
 Saturday Night Live (Episode: "Host: Tina Fey", Song: "Jack Sparrow") (NBC)
 Saturday Night Live (Episode: "Host: Justin Timberlake", Song: "3-Way (The Golden Rule)") (NBC)
|-
| style="vertical-align:top;" width="50%" colspan="2" | 
 The Borgias (Showtime) Any Human Heart (PBS)
 Camelot (Starz)
 Episodes (Showtime)
 The Kennedys (ReelzChannel)
 Mildred Pierce (HBO)
|}

Picture Editing
{| class="wikitable"
|+ 
|-
| style="vertical-align:top;" width="50%" | 
 Boardwalk Empire (Episode: "Boardwalk Empire") (HBO) Dexter (Episode: "Take It!") (Showtime)
 The Killing (Episode: "Pilot") (AMC)
 Mad Men (Episode: "Blowing Smoke") (AMC)
 Mad Men (Episode: "The Suitcase") (AMC)
| style="vertical-align:top;" width="50%" | 
 How I Met Your Mother (Episode: "Subway Wars") (CBS) 30 Rock (Episode: "100") (NBC)
 The Big Bang Theory (Episode: "The Agreement Dissection") (CBS)
 Modern Family (Episode: "Halloween") (ABC)
 Modern Family (Episode: "Slow Down Your Neighbors") (ABC)
|-
| style="vertical-align:top;" width="50%" | 
 Cinema Verite (HBO) Downton Abbey (Episode: "Part One") (PBS)
 Mildred Pierce (Episode: "Part Four") (HBO)
 Sherlock ("A Study in Pink")
 Too Big to Fail (HBO)
| style="vertical-align:top;" width="50%" | 
 Deadliest Catch (Episode: "Redemption Day") (Discovery Channel) The Amazing Race (Episode: "You Don't Get Paid Unless You Win") (CBS)
 Project Runway (Episode: "There is an 'I' in Team") (Lifetime)
 Survivor (Episode: "Don't You Work for Me?") (CBS)
 Top Chef (Episode: "Give Me Your Huddled Masses") (Bravo)
|-
| style="vertical-align:top;" width="50%" colspan="2" | 
 Freedom Riders (PBS) American Masters ("LENNONYC") (PBS)
 Anthony Bourdain: No Reservations (Episode: "Haiti") (Travel Channel)
 Becoming Chaz (OWN)
 If God Is Willing and da Creek Don't Rise (HBO)
|}

Sound
{| class="wikitable"
|+ 
|-
| style="vertical-align:top;" width="50%" | 
 Boardwalk Empire (Episode: "Boardwalk Empire") (HBO) Game of Thrones (Episode: "A Golden Crown") (HBO)
 Nikita (Episode: "Pandora") (The CW)
 True Blood (Episode: "Hitting The Ground") (HBO)
 The Walking Dead (Episode: "Days Gone Bye") (AMC)
| style="vertical-align:top;" width="50%" | 
 The Pillars of the Earth (Starz) Cinema Verite (HBO)
 Mildred Pierce (Episode: "Part Five") (HBO)
 Too Big to Fail (HBO)
|-
| style="vertical-align:top;" width="50%" | 
 Gettysburg (History) The Amazing Race (Episode: "You Don't Get Paid Unless You Win") (CBS)
 American Idol (Episode: "Auditions No. 2: New Orleans") (Fox)
 American Masters (Episode: "Jeff Bridges: The Dude Abides") (PBS)
 Baseball: The Tenth Inning (Episode: "Top of the Tenth") (PBS)
 Whale Wars (Episode: "To the Ends of the Earth") (Animal Planet)
| style="vertical-align:top;" width="50%" | 
 House (Episode: "Bombshells") (Fox) Boardwalk Empire (Episode: "Boardwalk Empire") (HBO)
 Burn Notice (Episode: "Last Stand") (USA)
 Dexter (Episode: "Take It!") (Showtime)
 Glee (Episode: "The Substitute") (Fox)
 Mad Men (Episode: "The Suitcase") (AMC)
|-
| style="vertical-align:top;" width="50%" | 
 The Kennedys (Episode: "Lancer and Lace") (ReelzChannel) Cinema Verite (HBO)
 Mildred Pierce (Episode: "Part Five") (HBO)
 Too Big to Fail (HBO)
| style="vertical-align:top;" width="50%" | 
 Family Guy (Episode: "Road to the North Pole") (Fox) Californication (Episode: "The Last Supper") (Showtime)
 Modern Family (Episode: "Halloween") (ABC)
 The Office (Episode: "Andy's Play") (NBC)
 Parks and Recreation (Episode: "Andy and April's Fancy Party") (NBC)
|-
| style="vertical-align:top;" width="50%" | 
 American Idol (Episode: "Finale") (Fox) 53rd Grammy Awards (CBS)
 83rd Academy Awards (ABC)
| style="vertical-align:top;" width="50%" | 
 Deadliest Catch (Episode: "Redemption Day") (Discovery Channel) The Amazing Race (Episode: "You Don't Get Paid Unless You Win") (CBS)
 American Idol (Episode: "Auditions No. 2: New Orleans") (Fox)
 American Masters ("LENNONYC") (PBS)
 Gettysburg (History)
|}

Special Visual Effects
{| class="wikitable"
|+ 
|-
| style="vertical-align:top;" width="50%" | 
 Boardwalk Empire (Episode: "Boardwalk Empire") (HBO) The Borgias (Episode: "The Poisoned Chalice" / "The Assassin") (Showtime)
 Game of Thrones (Episode: "Fire and Blood") (HBO)
 Stargate Universe (Episode: "Awakening") (Syfy)
 The Walking Dead (Episode: "Days Gone Bye") (AMC)
| style="vertical-align:top;" width="50%" | 
 Gettysburg (History) Mildred Pierce (Episode: "Part Five") (HBO)
 The Pillars of the Earth (Episode: "Witchcraft") (Starz)
 Sherlock ("A Study in Pink") (PBS)
|}

Stunt Coordination
{| class="wikitable"
|+ 
|-
| style="vertical-align:top;" | 
 Southland (Episode: "Graduation Day") (TNT) Game of Thrones (Episode: "The Wolf and the Lion") (HBO)
 Hawaii Five-0 (Episode: "Ua Hiki Mai Kapalena Pau (Until the End is Near)") (CBS)
 Spartacus: Gods of the Arena (Episode: "The Bitter End") (Starz)
|}

Technical Direction
{| class="wikitable"
|+ 
|-
| style="vertical-align:top;" width="50%" | 
 American Idol (Episode: "Finale") (Fox) 30 Rock (Episode: "Live Show (West Coast") (NBC)
 The Daily Show with Jon Stewart (Episode: "Episode 15135") (Comedy Central)
 Dancing with the Stars (Episode: "Episode 1104A") (ABC)
 Saturday Night Live (Episode: "Host: Justin Timberlake") (NBC)
| style="vertical-align:top;" width="50%" | 
 Great Performances: Don Pasquale (PBS)' 53rd Grammy Awards (CBS)
 83rd Academy Awards (ABC)
 The Kennedy Center Honors (CBS)
 Lady Gaga Presents the Monster Ball Tour: At Madison Square Garden (HBO)
|}

Writing
{| class="wikitable"
|+ 
|-
| style="vertical-align:top;" width="50%" | 
 'Freedom Riders (PBS) Anthony Bourdain: No Reservations (Episode: "Haiti") (Travel Channel)
 Gasland (HBO)
 Gettysburg (History)
 Moguls and Movie Stars (Episode: "The Birth of Hollywood") (TCM)
| style="vertical-align:top;" width="50%" | 
 64th Tony Awards (CBS)' Colin Quinn: Long Story Short (HBO)
 Louis C.K.: Hilarious (Epix)
 Night of Too Many Stars: An Overbooked Benefit for Autism Education (Comedy Central)
 The Real Women of SNL (NBC)
|}

Programs with multiple awards
By network 
 HBO – 15
 PBS – 10
 Fox – 9
 CBS – 7
 NBC – 5
 Discovery Channel / History – 4
 ABC / Cartoon Network / ReelzChannel – 3

 By program
 Boardwalk Empire – 7
 Deadliest Catch / Gettysburg'' – 4

Note

References

External links
 Academy of Television Arts and Sciences website

063 Creative Arts
Creative Arts
Creative Arts
2011 in Los Angeles
2011 awards in the United States
September 2011 events in the United States